Nasreddin is a crater on Pluto's largest moon, Charon. The crater was first observed by NASA's New Horizons space probe on its flyby of Pluto in 2015. The name was chosen as a reference to Nasreddin, the hero of humorous folktales told throughout the Middle East, Southern Europe, and parts of Asia. 

The location of Nasreddin crater is in the northern Pluto-facing hemisphere of Charon, north of Mandjet Chasma in a region informally called Oz Terra. The crater has bright bluish rays, which have exposed both ammonia ice and water ice.

See also
 List of geological features on Charon

References

Impact craters on Charon
New Horizons